Carlos Whitman Moore (August 13, 1906 – July 2, 1958) is a former Major League Baseball player.

Moore's playing career in the majors spanned one month. He made his major league debut with the Washington Senators on May 4, 1930, and pitched his final game with them on May 30. He was effective in his four games on the mound, posting a 2.31 ERA in 11 of relief work and allowing only 13 baserunners.

After the end of Moore's playing career, he worked as a manager in the minor leagues. While working in this capacity  for the Jeanerette Blues of the Evangeline League, Moore noted the strong throwing arm of his team's weak-hitting first baseman Eddie Lopat, and he suggested that Lopat might want to consider a career as a pitcher. Lopat subsequently developed into an All-Star, winning 166 major league games and earning five World Series rings in the starting rotation of the New York Yankees.

References

External links

1906 births
1958 deaths
Washington Senators (1901–1960) players
Major League Baseball pitchers
Baseball players from Tennessee
Minor league baseball managers
Chattanooga Lookouts players
Shreveport Sports players
Springfield Ponies players
New Orleans Pelicans (baseball) players
Atlanta Crackers players
Birmingham Barons players
Greenwood Chiefs players
Opelousas Indians players
Jeanerette Blues players
Abbeville A's players
People from Clinton, Tennessee